The German Research Center for Artificial Intelligence (German: Deutsches Forschungszentrum für Künstliche Intelligenz, DFKI) is one of the world's largest nonprofit contract research institutes for software technology based on artificial intelligence (AI) methods. DFKI was founded in 1988, and has facilities in the German cities of Kaiserslautern, Saarbrücken, Lübeck, Oldenburg, Osnabrück, Bremen, Darmstadt and Berlin.

DFKI shareholders include Google, Microsoft, SAP and Daimler. The directors are Antonio Krüger (CEO) and Helmut Ditzer (CFO).

Research 

DFKI conducts contract research in virtually all fields of modern AI, including image and pattern recognition, knowledge management, intelligent visualization and simulation, deduction and multi-agent systems, speech- and language technology, intelligent user interfaces, business informatics and robotics. DFKI led the national project Verbmobil, a project with the aim to translate spontaneous speech robustly and bidirectionally for German/English and German/Japanese.

Branches 

There are different research departments.

Kaiserslautern 

 Embedded Intelligence (Paul Lukowicz)
 Augmented Vision (Didier Stricker)
 Innovative Factory Systems (Martin Ruskowski)
 Intelligent Networks (Hans Dieter Schotten)
 Smart Data & Knowledge Services (Andreas Dengel)
 Data Science & its Applications (Sebastian Vollmer)

Saarbrücken 

 Cognitive Assistants (Antonio Krüger)
 Institute for Information Systems (Peter Loos)
 Agents and Simulated Reality (Philipp Slusallek)
 Multilinguality and Language Technology (Josef van Genabith)
 Algorithmic Business and Production (Jana Koehler)
 Smart Service Engineering (Wolfgang Maaß)

Bremen 

 Robotics Innovation Center  (Frank Kirchner)
 Cyber Physical Systems (Rolf Drechsler)

Berlin 

 Interactive Textiles (Gesche Joost)
 Intelligent Analytics for Massive Data - Smart Data (Volker Markl)
 Speech and Language Technology (Sebastian Möller)
 Educational Technology Lab (Niels Pinkwart)

Osnabrück 

 Plan-Based Robot Control (Joachim Hertzberg)
 Smart Enterprise Engineering (Oliver Thomas)

Oldenburg 

 Marine Perception (Oliver Zielinski)
 Interactive Machine Learning (Daniel Sonntag)

Lübeck 

 AI in Biomedical Signal Processing (Alfred Mertins)
 AI in Medical Imaging (Heinz Handels)
 Stochastic Relational AI in Healthcare (Ralf Möller)

Darmstadt 

 Systems Artificial Intelligence (Kristian Kersting)
 Systems AI for Robot Learning (Jan Peters)
 Systems AI for Decision Support (Carsten Binnig)

See also 

 CLAIRE, a European organization on artificial intelligence
Artificial intelligence
Glossary of artificial intelligence

Notes

External links 

 Official website
 Professor Wolfgang Wahlster Profile

Artificial intelligence laboratories
Computer science institutes in Germany
Laboratories in Germany
Information technology research institutes